Montclair Elementary School may refer to:
 Montclair Elementary School - Oakland Unified School District - Oakland, California
 Montclair Elementary School - Clay County School District - Orange Park, Florida
 Montclair Elementary School - Escambia County School District - Pensacola, Florida
 Montclair Elementary School - Beaverton School District - Portland, Oregon
 Montclair Elementary School - Garland Independent School District - Garland, Texas